2015 in paleoentomology is a list of new fossil insect taxa that were described during the year 2015, as well as other significant discoveries and events related to paleoentomology that were scheduled to occur during the year.

Coleoptera

Dipterans

Hemipterans

Hymenopterans

Neuroptera

Orthoptera

Other insects

References

2015 in paleontology
Paleoentomology